Nay Htet Lin  (also spelt Nay Htet Lynn) is an Arakanese Actor and film director.

Filmography

Film (Cinema)
Responsible Citizen (ႏိုင္ငံႀကီးသား) 2019
ဟောက်စား
Tiger and elephant
Tain Tway Ngo Loh Moe Phit Tar (2000)

Television series
Monetine Ko Rainsine Hkasetth (မုန်တိုင်းကိုရင်ဆိုင်ခဲ့သူ) 2017

References

Living people
Burmese male film actors
Burmese male models
21st-century Burmese actresses
Year of birth missing (living people)